Holly Deveaux (born 1994 in Toronto, Ontario) is a Canadian actress. She is known for starring in the television series Baxter, Less Than Kind, and Spun Out.

Career 
In 2012, Deveaux was cast as Casey Anthony in Prosecuting Casey Anthony, a television movie based on death of Caylee Anthony, though the part was ultimately recast. The same year her performance in the television film The Phantoms garnered praise from The Globe and Mail reviewer John Doyle who remarked, "Outstanding is Deveaux as Tess, the most complex and troubled of the teenagers. Deveaux (last seen in Less Than Kind) is luminous, her pale face subtly registering every hurt, every worry and every insult that comes her way..." In 2014, she starred in the Syfy original movie Mutant World. In 2015, she played a prominent guest role on an episode of Rookie Blue playing a dangerous prison inmate.

Filmography

References

External links 
 

1994 births
Actresses from Toronto
Canadian film actresses
Canadian television actresses
Living people